Ostrožno pri Ločah is a small dispersed settlement in the hills south of Loče in the Municipality of Slovenske Konjice in eastern Slovenia. It lies on the left bank of the Dravinja River. The area is part of the traditional region of Styria. The municipality is now included in the Savinja Statistical Region.

Name
Together with Ostrožno pri Ponikvi, this constituted a single settlement named Ostrožno until 1953. Ostrožno was split into two parts in 1953, and the part in the Municipality of Slovenske Konjice was renamed Ostrožno pri Ločah.

References

External links
Ostrožno pri Ločah at Geopedia

Populated places in the Municipality of Slovenske Konjice